Igor Dmitriyevich Sergeyev (20 April 1938 – 10 November 2006) was a Soviet and later Russian military officer who was Minister of Defense of Russia from 22 May 1997 to 28 March 2001. He was the first and, as of 2023, the only Marshal of the Russian Federation.

Career
Sergeyev served briefly in the Navy but later transferred to the Army, where he spent most of his career in the Strategic Rocket Forces. Sergeyev became commander in chief of the Strategic Rocket Forces in 1992. In this position he was in charge of securing the former USSR's nuclear weapons.

Defense Minister
Sergeyev was appointed Minister of Defense in 1997 by Russian President Boris Yeltsin. He was promoted to Marshal of the Russian Federation on 21 November 1997, the only Russian military officer to achieve that rank. Marshal Sergeyev accepted reform within a limited budget under civilian political control. The number of military educational establishments was reduced markedly from their previous levels, which had not changed since Soviet times. A number of army divisions were given "permanent readiness" status, which was supposed to bring them up to 80 percent manning and 100 percent equipment holdings. Sergeyev directed most of his efforts toward promoting the interests of the Strategic Rocket Forces. All military space forces were absorbed into the Strategic Rocket Forces, and the Ground Forces Headquarters was abolished. The Airborne Forces suffered some reductions, while the Naval Infantry only escaped due to their competent performance in Chechnya. Much of the available procurement money was invested in acquiring new rockets.

In December 1999, Marshal Sergeyev called NATO enlargement, in and of itself, a threat to global and European collective security and world politics. He particularly stressed the deployment and use of NATO forces out of area without a United Nations or OSCE mandate as a threat that devalues confidence-building measures, arms control treaties and security.

Sergeyev was dismissed as defense minister in March 2001 and was replaced by Sergei Ivanov.

Sergeyev died on 10 November 2006 from the effects of blood cancer.

Criticism
Marshal Sergeyev is blamed by some for not effectively acting during the War of Dagestan in 1999 but is also praised for the fact that the Russian military captured the Chechen capital Grozny in 2000 during the Second Chechen War. However, the ongoing fighting in the south of the country caused some concern about his efficacy after Vladimir Putin became president.

Honours and awards
 Hero of the Russian Federation
 Order of Merit for the Fatherland, 2nd class (28 March 2001)
 Order of Military Merit
 Order of Honour (20 April 2003)
 Order of October Revolution
 Order of the Red Banner of Labour
 Order for Service to the Homeland in the Armed Forces of the USSR, 3rd class
 Order of the Red Star
 Medal "Veteran of the Armed Forces of the USSR"
 Medal "For Impeccable Service" 1st, 2nd and 3rd classes
 Medal of Zhukov 
 Order "Manas", 3rd class (Kyrgyzstan, 20 December 1999)
 Order Unification (South Korea)
 Order of the Yugoslav Star, 1st class (Yugoslavia, 23 December 1999)
 Award of the Government of the Russian Federation in the Field of Science and Technology
 Order of Saint Righteous Grand Duke Dmitry Donskoy

References

External links

1938 births
2006 deaths
People from Lysychansk
Deaths from leukemia
Burials in Troyekurovskoye Cemetery
People of the Chechen wars
Defence ministers of Russia
Kursk submarine disaster
Soviet Navy personnel
Soviet generals
Deaths from cancer in Russia
Heroes of the Russian Federation
Recipients of the Order "For Merit to the Fatherland", 2nd class
Recipients of the Order of Military Merit (Russia)
Recipients of the Order of Honour (Russia)
Marshals
Military Academy of the General Staff of the Armed Forces of the Soviet Union alumni